The Brenner debate was a major debate amongst Marxist historians during the late 1970s and early 1980s, regarding the origins of capitalism. The debate began with Robert Brenner's 1976 journal article "Agrarian class structure and economic development in pre-industrial Europe", published in the influential historical journal Past & Present. 

It has been seen as a successor to the so-called "transition debate" (or Dobb-Sweezy debate) that followed Maurice Dobb's 1946 Studies in the Development of Capitalism, and Paul Sweezy's 1950 article "The transition from feudalism to capitalism", in the journal Science & Society. These articles were subsequently collected and published as a book, also entitled The Transition from Feudalism to Capitalism, in 1976.

Historians Trevor Aston and C. H. E. Philpin (1985) characterised the Brenner debate as "one of the most important historical debates of recent years."

Brenner's thesis 
Brenner's main argument in "Agrarian class structure and economic development in pre-industrial Europe" is to challenge traditional explanations for economic development in late-medieval and early-modern Europe.

In particular, Brenner critiques the two overarching interpretations of economic change in this period, which he calls the demographic and commercialization models. In the demographic model, long-term economic changes are primarily attributed to changes in population, while the commercialization model attributes changes primarily to the growth of trade and the market.

Contrary to these explanations, Brenner argues that class relations, or class power, determine the degree to which demographic or commercial changes affect long-run trends in the distribution of income and economic growth. He further argues that class structures tend to be resilient in relation to the impact of economic forces.

Response
Brenner's thesis was the focus of a symposium in around 1977, several contributions to which also appeared in the pages of Past & Present. Brenner's article and the discussions that followed it have a broad significance for understanding the origins of capitalism, and were foundational to so-called "Political Marxism".

In 1978, Michael Postan and John Hatcher characterised the debate as attempting to determine whether Malthusian cyclic explanations of population and development or social class explanations governed demographic and economic change in Europe. The debate challenged the prevalent views of regarding class relations in the economy of England in the Middle Ages in particular – and agricultural societies with serfdom in general, as well as engaging the broader historiography of the economics of feudalism from the 20th century (in both the west and the Soviet Union).

Even though Brenner's key ideas have not achieved consensus, the debate has remained influential in 21st century scholarship,

In the view of Shami Ghosh, Brenner's thesis proposed an explanatory framework for the evolution of what he called "agrarian capitalism" in England, during the 15th and 16th centuries.[A] transformation of relationships between landlords and cultivators led to the creation of a largely free and competitive market in land and labour, while simultaneously dispossessing most of the peasants. Thus from the old class divisions of owners of land on the one hand, and an unfree peasantry with customary rights of use to land on the other, a new tripartite structure came into being, comprising landlords, free tenant farmers on relatively short-term market-determined leases and wage labourers; this Brenner defines as ‘agrarian capitalism’. Wage labourers were completely market-dependent – a rural proletariat – and tenant farmers had to compete on the land market in order to retain their access to land. This last fact was the principal motor of innovation leading to a rise in productivity, which, coupled with the growth of a now-free labour market, was essential for the development of modern (industrial) capitalism. Thus the transformations of agrarian class structures lay at the root of the development of capitalism in England.

Publications
Brenner's original article, and the symposium on it, led to a series of publications in Past & Present:

 Brenner, Robert (1976). ‘Agrarian Class Structure and Economic Development in Pre-Industrial Europe,’ Past & Present, 70, February, pp. 30–75.
 Postan, M.M. & Hatcher, John (1978). ‘Population and Class Relations in Feudal Society,’ Past & Present, 78, February, pp. 24–37.
 Croot, Patricia & Parker, David (1978). ‘Agrarian Class Structure and the Development of Capitalism: France and England Compared,’ Past & Present, 78, February, pp. 37–47
 Wunder, Heide (1978). ‘Peasant Organization and Class Conflict in Eastern and Western Germany,’ Past & Present, 78, February, pp. 48–55.
 Le Roy Ladurie, Emmanuel (1978). ‘A Reply to Robert Brenner,’ Past & Present, 79, May, pp. 55–59
 Bois, Guy (1978). ‘Against the Neo-Malthusian Orthodoxy,’ Past & Present, 79, May, pp. 60–69
 Hilton, R. H. (1978). ‘A Crisis of Feudalism,’ Past & Present, 80, August, 3-19
 Cooper, J. P. (1978). ‘In Search of Agrarian Capitalism,’ Past & Present, 80, August, pp. 20–65
 Klíma, Arnošt (1979). ‘Agrarian Class Structure and Economic Development in Pre-Industrial Bohemia,’ Past & Present, 85, November, pp. 49–67
 Brenner, Robert (1982). ‘The Agrarian Roots of European Capitalism,’ Past & Present, 97 November, pp. 16–113

These studies were republished with some additional material in The Brenner Debate: Agrarian Class Structure and Economic Development in Pre-Industrial Europe, ed. by Trevor Aston and C.H.E. Philpin, Past and Present Publications (Cambridge: Cambridge University Press, 1985), which was to be reprinted many times.

A related and parallel debate also took place in the pages of the New Left Review:

 Brenner, Robert (1977). ‘The Origins of Capitalist Development: A Critique of Neo-Smithian Marxism‘, New Left Review, I/104, July–August pp. 25–92.
 Sweezy, Paul (1978). ‘Comment on Brenner,’ New Left Review, I/108, March–April, pp. 94–5
 Brenner, Robert (1978). ‘Reply to Sweezy,’ New Left Review, I/108, March–April, pp. 95–6
 Fine, Ben (1978). ‘On the Origins of Capitalist Development,’ New Left Review, I/109, May–June, pp. 88–95

As of 2016, Brenner's most recent statements of his ideas, making some small modifications to his earlier claims, were:

 Brenner, R., 1985. ‘The Social Basis of Economic Development’. In Analytical Marxism, ed. J. Roemer, 25–53. Cambridge, UK: Cambridge University Press.
 Brenner, R., 2001. ‘The Low Countries in the Transition to Capitalism’. Journal of Agrarian Change, 1: 169–241.
 Brenner, R., 2007. ‘Property and Progress: Where Adam Smith Went Wrong’. In Marxist History-Writing for the Twenty-First Century, ed. C. Wickham, 49–111. Oxford: Oxford University Press.

References

History of agriculture
Capitalism